Marion Mills is an unincorporated community in Marion Township, Owen County, in the U.S. state of Indiana.

History
An old variant name of the community was called Hausertown. A post office was established under the Hausertown name in 1838, and remained in operation until it was discontinued in 1907. The community's present name was taken from Marion Township.

Geography

References

Unincorporated communities in Owen County, Indiana
Unincorporated communities in Indiana